In human mitochondrial genetics, haplogroup Q is a human mitochondrial DNA (mtDNA) haplogroup typical for Oceania. It is a subgroup of haplogroup M29'Q.

Origin
Haplogroup Q is a descendant of haplogroup M.

Distribution
Today, mitochondrial DNA Haplogroup Q is found in the southern Pacific region, especially in New Guinea, Melanesia and indigenous Australians. Haplogroup Q is very diverse and frequently occurring among Papuan and Melanesian populations, with an inferred coalescence time of approximately 50,000 years before present. The frequency of this haplogroup among the populations of the islands of Wallacea in eastern Indonesia is quite high, indicating some genetic affinity between the populations of these islands and the indigenous peoples of New Guinea. Haplogroup Q has also been found at higher frequencies, among modern populations of Sundaland but in moderate frequencies Micronesia, and Polynesia. In Southeast Asia it is found in lower frequencies. Malaysians 1.8%, It's also found in Indonesians, Filipinos (especially in Surigaonon people it's 4.17%), Balinese 1.2%, Borneans 1.3%,

Subclades

Tree
This phylogenetic tree of haplogroup Q subclades is based on the paper by Mannis van Oven and Manfred Kayser Updated comprehensive phylogenetic tree of global human mitochondrial DNA variation and subsequent published research.

Q
Q1'2
Q1
Q1a
Q1b
Q1c
Q2
Q2a
Q2b
Q3
Q3a
Q3a1
Q3b

See also

Genealogical DNA test
Genetic genealogy
Human mitochondrial genetics
Population genetics
Human mitochondrial DNA haplogroups

References

External links
General
Ian Logan's Mitochondrial DNA Site
Mannis van Oven's Phylotree

Q